In taxonomy, Natronobacterium is a genus of the Natrialbaceae.  A member of the domain Archaea, it is both an extreme halophile and alkaliphile, thriving at an optimum saline concentration of 20% and optimum pH of 10.

Taxonomy
As of 2022, there are 2 species described in this genus.
Proposed species
 Natronobacterium chahanensis and Natronobacterium innemongoliae are proposed names for strains isolated from soda lakes in China. As of 2022, the descriptions from 1989 (N. chahanensis) and 1997 (N. innemongoliae) are not validly published.

Species formerly placed in this taxon.
 Natronobacterium magadii, now Natrialba magadii
 Natronobacterium nitratireducens, now Halobiforma nitratireducens
 Natronobacterium pharaonis, now Natronomonas pharaonis
 Natronobacterium vacuolatum, now Halorubrum vacuolatum

References

Further reading

Scientific journals

Scientific books

 
 Madigan, Michael T., et al.  Brock Biology of Microorganisms.  13th ed.  Benjamin Cummings: San Francisco, 2012.  p. 38.

Scientific databases

External links

Archaea genera
Taxa described in 1984